Nigel Thomson (1945–1999) was an Australian artist who won the Archibald Prize twice. Known for satirical paintings of Australian society. He studied at the Julian Ashton Art School in Sydney and later taught artistic composition at that institution.
He was art tutor at the Royal Academy of Art in The Hague.

He won the Archibald with Chandler Coventry in 1983, and Barbara Blackman in 1997. Thomson's painting of Patrick White's long-term partner, Manoly Lascaris was rejected from the 1995 Archibald and hung in the Salon des Refusés.

He won the Sulman Prize in 1983 with  Marat, The Unsophisticated will be Shocked by the Depiction of your Death: or, the Artist Answers His Critics. This painting was based on Jacques-Louis David's famous painting Death of Marat showing Jean-Paul Marat dead in a bathtub.

He jointly won the Sulman Prize in 1986 along with Wendy Sharpe, for The State Institution.

External links
Australian art gallery

Official Website: http://www.nigelthomson.com

1945 births
1999 deaths
Archibald Prize winners
20th-century Australian painters
20th-century Australian male artists
Academic staff of the Royal Academy of Art, The Hague
Julian Ashton Art School alumni
Australian portrait painters
Australian male painters